Rosenscheldia is a genus of fungi in the class Dothideomycetes. The relationship of this taxon to other taxa within the class is unknown (incertae sedis).

See also 
 List of Dothideomycetes genera incertae sedis

References

External links 
 Rosenscheldia at Index Fungorum

Dothideomycetes enigmatic taxa
Dothideomycetes genera